Syzygium hemilamprum, commonly known as the broad-leaved lilly pilly, blush satinash, cassowary gum, Eungella gum, and treated as Acmena hemilampra in New South Wales and Queensland, is a species of flowering plant in the family Myrtaceae and is native to New South Wales, Queensland and the Northern Territory. It is a rainforest tree with broadly lance-shaped to elliptic leaves, panicles of white flowers and more or less spherical white fruit.

Description 
The trunk is flanged or buttressed in larger trees, and has fissured and flaky reddish-brown bark. The leaves are glossy and more or less glabrous on the upper surface and paler below. Flowering occurs from October to November and the fruit is white and more less spherical,  in diameter.

Taxonomy
This lilly pilly was first formally described in 1875 by Ferdinand von Mueller and given the name Eugenia hemilampra in Flora Australiensis. In the same publication, von Mueller also gave it the alternative name Eugenia smithii var. hemilampra and both names are validly published. 

In 1938, Elmer Drew Merrill and Lily May Perry changed the name E. hemilampra to Acmena hemilampra in the Journal of the Arnold Arboretum, and the name Acmena hemilampra Merr. & L.M.Perry is the name used by the National Herbarium of New South Wales. Then in 2006, Lyndley Craven and Edward Sturt Biffin changed von Mueller's E. hemilampra to Syzygium hemilamprum in the journal Blumea. The name Syzygium hemilamprum is accepted by the Australian Plant Census.

Distribution and habitat
Often seen on sand by the sea in littoral rainforests, it reaches its best development in the red/brown volcanic soils, such as around the Mount Warning caldera. The natural range of distribution is from Yamba to Cape York Peninsula in the far north eastern tip of Australia. 

Removal of the flesh from the seed is advised to assist seed germination. Germination is slow, taking up to 80 days. However, cuttings strike well.

References

  (other publication details, included in citation)

hemilamprum
Myrtales of Australia
Flora of New South Wales
Flora of Queensland
Flora of the Northern Territory
Myrtaceae
Taxa named by Ferdinand von Mueller